The Wrong Husband (German: Der falsche Ehemann) is a 1931 German comedy film directed by Johannes Guter and starring Johannes Riemann, Maria Paudler and Gustav Waldau.

Cast
 Johannes Riemann as Peter and Paul Hanneman  
 Maria Paudler as Ruth, Peters Frau  
 Gustav Waldau as H.H. Hardegg aus Buenos Aires  
 Jessie Vihrog as Ines Hardegg, seine Tochter  
 Tibor Halmay as Maxim Tartakoff  
 Martha Ziegler as Fräulein Schulze, Sekretärin  
 Fritz Strehlen as Ein Maharadscha  
 Klaus Pohl 
 Fred Kassen as Singer: Einmal wird dein Herzchen dir gehören 
 Comedian Harmonists as Themselves

References

Bibliography
 Sikov, Ed. On Sunset Boulevard: The Life and Times of Billy Wilder.  Hyperion, 1999.

External links

1931 films
Films of the Weimar Republic
1931 comedy films
German comedy films
1930s German-language films
Films directed by Johannes Guter
UFA GmbH films
German black-and-white films
Films scored by Norbert Glanzberg
1930s German films